Leonardo da Silva Souza (born 18 March 1992), known simply as Leonardo, is a Brazilian professional footballer. He operates as an attacking midfielder who can play on both flanks.

Leonardo arrived to Europe at an early age, making his senior debuts with Cypriot club Enosis Neon Paralimni in 2012. He subsequently moved to Ukrainian club Metalurh Donetsk in early 2013. After six months there, Leonardo switched to Azerbaijani club Gabala. He changed clubs and countries again in August 2014, joining Russian club Anzhi Makhachkala. In the summer of 2016, Leonardo signed with Serbian club Partizan, helping them win the double in the 2016–17 season.

Career

Early years
A native of Paraná, Leonardo started out at local club Matsubara. He later moved to Belgium and joined the youth team of Beerschot. In April 2012, it was announced that Leonardo signed a three-year contract with Ukrainian club Tavriya Simferopol with an effective date of 1 July 2012. He eventually joined Cypriot side Enosis Neon Paralimni only a few months later. After promising performances in Cyprus, Leonardo made a return to Ukraine and signed with Metalurh Donetsk on a three-year deal in January 2013. However, due to player's third-party ownership with his agent Dmitry Selyuk, the Cypriot club did not receive any transfer fee.

Gabala
On 13 July 2013, Leonardo joined Azerbaijani club Gabala on a one-year deal. He scored seven league goals from 31 appearances in the 2013–14 season. They also finished as runners-up in the Azerbaijan Cup, losing on penalties to Neftçi after a 1–1 draw.

Anzhi Makhachkala

On 10 August 2014, Leonardo signed a two-year contract with Russian club Anzhi Makhachkala. He scored his first competitive goal for the club on his 23rd birthday, finding the back of the net in the 84th minute of a 5–1 home league victory over Yenisey Krasnoyarsk. On 10 May 2015, Leonardo scored twice in a 3–1 home win over Tyumen. He scored a total of seven league goals in his debut season in the country, helping the club win promotion back to the Premier League at the first time. On 22 August 2015, Leonardo scored his first RFPL goal in a 1–1 draw with Ural Yekaterinburg, converting a second-half penalty. However, the club eventually terminated his contract on 25 February 2016, due to the player's disciplinary record.

Partizan
In June 2016, it was announced that Leonardo agreed to join Serbian club Partizan on a three-year deal. He was officially presented two weeks later and assigned the number 42 shirt. On 24 July 2016, Leonardo made his competitive debut for Partizan, coming off the bench as a second-half substitute for Miroslav Radović in the goalless draw against Bačka. He netted his first goal for the club on 20 August 2016, shortly after substituting Saša Ilić in an eventual 1–2 away loss to Spartak Subotica. Seven days later, Leonardo scored from a direct free kick in a 4–0 home league win over Rad.

On 17 September 2016, Leonardo scored the winning goal in the 89th minute of the Belgrade derby, giving his team a 1–0 win at home. He subsequently found the back of the net in the next four games, including a remarkable goal in a 1–0 away win over Metalac Gornji Milanovac. By the end of the year, Leonardo scored six more league goals, including two braces in two home wins over Napredak Kruševac (3–2) in November, and Spartak Subotica (2–0) in December.

On 18 April 2017, Leonardo scored a brace in the Belgrade derby, an eventual 3–1 away success. He ultimately collected the domestic double in his debut season at Partizan. Due to his consistent performances in the process, Leonardo was named in the league's best eleven.

On 11 July 2017, Leonardo netted his first goal in UEFA competitions, giving Partizan a 2–0 home win over Budućnost Podgorica in the first leg of the Champions League second qualifying round.

On 3 August 2017, Leonardo was transferred to Saudi club Al-Ahli for a fee of €4 million. He signed a two-year deal with an option for two more seasons.

Al Wahda
In August 2018, Leonardo signed a two-year contract with Emirati club Al Wahda on a free transfer. He scored four goals to give his team a 4–3 home victory over Al-Rayyan in the fourth round of matches in Group B of the AFC Champions League.

Shabab Al-Ahli
On 31 August 2019, Shabab Al-Ahli has signed  Leonardo for one seasons from Al Wahda.

Personal life
Leonardo's older brother, Alan, is also a footballer.

In January 2016, during a vacation in his homeland, Leonardo was involved in a fatal road traffic accident whilst intoxicated.

Statistics

Honours

Club
Gabala
 Azerbaijan Cup: Runner-up 2013–14
Partizan
 Serbian SuperLiga: 2016–17
 Serbian Cup: 2016–17
Al Wahda
 UAE Super Cup: 2018

Individual
 Serbian SuperLiga Top Scorer: 2016–17
 Serbian SuperLiga Team of the Season: 2016–17
 2019 AFC Champions League OPTA Best XI
 2019 AFC Champions League Fans' Best XI

References

External links

 
 

1992 births
Sportspeople from Paraná (state)
Living people
Brazilian footballers
Association football forwards
Association football midfielders
Enosis Neon Paralimni FC players
FC Metalurh Donetsk players
Gabala FC players
FC Anzhi Makhachkala players
FK Partizan players
Al-Ahli Saudi FC players
Al Wahda FC players
Shabab Al-Ahli Club players
Maringá Futebol Clube players
Cianorte Futebol Clube players
Cypriot First Division players
Ukrainian Premier League players
Azerbaijan Premier League players
Russian First League players
Russian Premier League players
Serbian SuperLiga players
Saudi Professional League players
UAE Pro League players
Campeonato Paranaense players
Brazilian expatriate footballers
Expatriate footballers in Belgium
Brazilian expatriate sportspeople in Belgium
Expatriate footballers in Cyprus
Brazilian expatriate sportspeople in Cyprus
Expatriate footballers in Ukraine
Brazilian expatriate sportspeople in Ukraine
Expatriate footballers in Azerbaijan
Brazilian expatriate sportspeople in Azerbaijan
Expatriate footballers in Russia
Brazilian expatriate sportspeople in Russia
Expatriate footballers in Serbia
Brazilian expatriate sportspeople in Serbia
Expatriate footballers in Saudi Arabia
Brazilian expatriate sportspeople in Saudi Arabia
Expatriate footballers in the United Arab Emirates
Brazilian expatriate sportspeople in the United Arab Emirates